The 132nd Pennsylvania House of Representatives District is located in Southeastern Pennsylvania and has been represented since 2013 by Michael Schlossberg.

District profile
The 132nd Pennsylvania House of Representatives District is located within  Lehigh County. It includes Dorney Park. It is made up of the following areas:
 Allentown (PART)
 Ward 08 [PART, Divisions 04 and 07]
 Ward 11 [PART, Divisions 04, 05, 06, and 07]
 Ward 13 [PART, Division 04]
 Ward 17
 Ward 18
 South Whitehall Township
 Upper Macungie Township (PART)
 District 01
 District 02
 District 04
 District 05
 District 06

Representatives

Recent election results

References

External links
District map from the United States Census Bureau
Pennsylvania House Legislative District Maps from the Pennsylvania Redistricting Commission.  
Population Data for District 132 from the Pennsylvania Redistricting Commission.

Government of Lehigh County, Pennsylvania
132